XHIU-FM 105.7/XEIU-AM 990 is a combo radio station in Oaxaca, Oaxaca, known as Oreja FM with a Spanish adult hits format.

History
XEIU received its first concession on November 21, 1977. It broadcast on 1160 kHz as a daytimer, moving to 990 sometime in the 1980s or 1990s and then adding an FM station in 1994.
 
For some time, XEIU/XHIU was operated by Grupo ACIR and was the market's home of ACIR's Amor format, which was moved to XHOCA-FM in 2017. The combo station was then relaunched as Stereo Cristal.

On May 1, 2019, Grupo Radiorama ASG took control of XEIU/XHIU, bringing it under common operation with XHEOA-FM, XHOQ-FM and XHYN-FM. Within weeks, the station rebranded as "Oreja Cristal".

References

Radio stations in Oaxaca City
Radio stations established in 1977